Babe: Pig in the City is a 1998 comedy-drama adventure film. It is the sequel/epilogue to the 1995 film Babe and the second and final chapter of the Babe film series. It is co-written, produced and directed by George Miller, who co-wrote and produced the original film. Most of the actors from the first film reprised their respective roles, including James Cromwell, Miriam Margolyes, Hugo Weaving, Danny Mann, Roscoe Lee Browne and Magda Szubanski. Glenne Headly, Steven Wright, James Cosmo, Myles Jeffrey, and Mickey Rooney also feature. However, most of them have only brief appearances, as the story focuses on the journey of Babe (now voiced by Elizabeth Daily in place of Christine Cavanaugh).

The film was nominated for Best Original Song at the 1998 Academy Awards. The film was neither critically nor commercially as successful as its predecessor, grossing only $69.5 million on a $90 million budget and receiving mixed reviews.

Plot
A few weeks after the events of the first film, Arthur Hoggett is injured in an accident while he and Babe attempt to fix the farm's well, leaving his wife Esme to tend the farm alone. Then threatened with eviction at the end of the month unless the mortgage is paid, Esme takes Babe to a sheepdog herding contest in hope of using the prize money to save the farm. At the city of Metropolis' airport, an overzealous sniffer dog falsely signals that Babe and Esme are carrying drugs, causing them to miss their flight and forcing a few days wait for the next flight home.

At first unable to find a hotel that allows animals, Esme and Babe find accommodation at a hotel run by Miss Floom, who likes animals. There Babe is separated from Esme and meets a trio of chimpanzees—Bob, his wife Zootie and his little brother Easy—and Thelonius, a civilized Bornean orangutan who is a butler for the landlady's elderly uncle, Fugly. Babe is made part of their clown act, which he is reluctant to appear in until the apes insinuate that he will be paid. Meanwhile, Esme, believing Babe has escaped, goes looking for him but is arrested after an incident involving police officers and other bystanders while a gang of motorcycles attempted to mug her.

The next morning, Fugly is taken to the hospital in a food coma, accompanied by his niece. Left to fend for themselves, the hotel's animal occupants soon become hungry and the chimps decide to steal food from a store, using Babe to distract a pair of guard dogs. Babe rescues one of the dogs when he falls into a canal, who pledges to act as bodyguard to Babe. Having flown all the way to Metropolis, Ferdinand the Duck finds Babe at the hotel, where Zootie gives birth to twins. The celebration is interrupted when several unfriendly animal control officers are summoned there by the Flooms' neighbour, Hortense, who dislikes animals.

Most of the animals are removed except for Babe, Ferdinand, a capuchin monkey called Tug and a disabled Jack Russell terrier named Flealick. They infiltrate the animal control facility and rescue their wrongfully imprisoned friends. Released from custody, Esme returns to the hotel to find it in disarray and Miss Floom mourning her uncle and the animals capture. After confronting Hortense since she is the one responsible, they track down the animals to a charity dinner and retrieve them all. Floom sells the hotel and gives the proceeds to Esme to save the farm, where she and all the animals go to stay. Esme resumes her duties and Arthur recovers, and after finally fixing the farm's water pump, proudly smiles at Babe and says, "That'll do, Pig. That'll do."

Cast

 E. G. Daily as Babe, a pig.
 Magda Szubanski as Esme Cordelia Hoggett, Arthur's wife.
 Steven Wright as Bob, one of the Flooms' chimpanzees who is Zootie's husband and Easy's older brother.
 Mickey Rooney as Fugly Floom, Miss Floom's late uncle.
 Glenne Headly as Zootie, one of the Flooms' chimpanzees who is Bob's wife and Easy's sister-in-law.
 Nathan Kress and Myles Jeffrey as Easy, one of the Flooms' chimpanzees who is Bob's younger brother and Zootie's brother-in-law.
 James Cosmo as Thelonius, a civilized Bornean orangutan who is a servant to Fugly, and later to Arthur and Esme at the end of the film.
 Eddie Barth as Nigel, a Bulldog residing in the hotel.
 Eddie Barth also voices Alan, a Neapolitan Mastiff residing in the hotel.
 Adam Goldberg as Flealick, a disabled and talkative Jack Russell terrier.
 Danny Mann as Ferdinand, an Indian Runner duck.
 Mann also voices Tug, the Flooms' Panamanian white-faced capuchin
 Mary Stein as Miss Floom, the hotel's landlady and Fugly's niece.
 Roscoe Lee Browne as the narrator
 James Cromwell as Arthur Hoggett, Esme's husband.
 Stanley Ralph Ross as a Bull Terrier and Doberman Pinscher guard dog duo.
 Julie Godfrey as Hortense, the Flooms' neighbor.
 Janet Foye and Pamela Hawkins as Miss Hoggett's friends
 Russi Taylor as a poodle that lives on the streets.
 Russi Taylor also voices a choir cat
 Bill Capizzi as Snoop, an overzealous beagle who works at the airport as a security sniffer. 
 Miriam Margolyes as Fly, a Border Collie who is Rex's wife and Babe's adoptive mother.
 Hugo Weaving as Rex, a Border Collie who is the farm's lead sheepdog, Babe's adoptive father, and Fly's husband.
 Jim Cummings as a pelican
 Katie Leigh as a kitten
 Evelyn Krape as one of the farm's sheep
 Evelyn Krape also voices some alley cats
 Charles Bartlett as a cow
 Michael Edward-Stevens as a horse
 Nathan Kress as a puppy that lives on the streets.
 Paul Livingston as a chef at the charity event
 Kim Story as the judge
 John Upton as a boy at the hospital

The fish are voiced by Al Mancini and Larry Moss.

Additional character voices were provided by Lisa Bailey, Balyne Barbosa, Victor Brandt, Jeannie Elias, Pippa Grandison, J. D. Hall, Mark Hammond, Barbara Harris, Wendy Kamenoff, Scott Leavenworthy, Julie Oppenheimer, Deborah Packer, Roger Rose, Carly Schroeder, Joseph Sicari, Aaron Spann, Drew Lexi Thomas, and Naomi Watts.

Production
Christine Cavanaugh, who played Babe in the first film, was approached to reprise her role, but declined when contract negotiations fell through. Cavanaugh was eventually replaced by her Rugrats co-star E. G. Daily. The director of the successful first movie, Chris Noonan, had no involvement in Babe: Pig in the City; directorial duties were handled by George Miller and Noonan was reportedly not even invited to the premiere Australian screening.

Prior to the film's theatrical release, it was originally rated PG by the MPAA. The TV spots for the film's theatrical release mentioned this rating, as did a promotional poster. By the time the film was released in theaters it had been re-rated as G due to the film being re-edited and submitted again for review.

Babe: Pig in the City takes place in an imaginative, fantasy-like metropolis. The aesthetic is notably reminiscent of Oz.  The city has numerous styles of architecture from around the world. It also has a variety of waterways, noticeable by the hotel at which Babe stays. The downtown area appears to be situated on an island not dissimilar to Manhattan Island. The Downtown Skyline features numerous landmarks such as the World Trade Center, the Sears Tower, the Chrysler Building, the Empire State Building, the IDS Center, the MetLife Building, the Sydney Opera House, the Hollywood sign, the Golden Gate Bridge, the Fernsehturm Berlin, Big Ben, St. Basil's Cathedral of Moscow's Red Square, the Statue of Liberty, the Eiffel Tower, the Christ the Redeemer statue, among others.

The DVD covers feature a similar but different city of San Francisco.

Reception

Box office
Babe: Pig in the City opened on November 25, 1998, during Thanksgiving weekend, ranking in fifth place behind A Bug's Life, The Rugrats Movie, Enemy of the State and The Waterboy. The film made $6.4 million during its opening weekend, combined with $8.5 million from its first five days of release.

Critical response
On Rotten Tomatoes the film has 65% approval rating based on 65 reviews, with a weighted average of 6.24/10. Audiences surveyed by CinemaScore gave the film a grade "B" on scale of A+ to F. On Metacritic the film carries a score of 68, based on 25 reviews, indicating "generally favorable reviews".

On release the film received poor reviews by most critics, receiving the lowest marks; most believed the sequel had lost the innocence of the original. Empire's Andrew Collins said, "Where Babe brought deep-rooted joy, the sequel brings fidgety depression" and awarded the film one star. Janet Maslin of The New York Times said, "It will work as a sequel only hard-core Babe fans willing to follow this four-legged hero (or heroine, as Babe obviously is in some scenes) anywhere. Had Pig in the City been made first, it by no means could have prompted a sequel of its own." American film critic Gene Siskel, on the other hand, named it as his choice for the best movie of 1998 over more adult-oriented films like Saving Private Ryan, Life Is Beautiful and Shakespeare in Love. Roger Ebert gave the film four out of four stars and said it was "more magical than the original Babe."

In the decades since Babe: Pig in the City release, the movie has developed a cult following. Tom Waits expressed appreciation for the film during a 2010 interview with Mojo Magazine. Radio personality/podcaster Jesse Thorn has also praised the film.

Awards
Peter Gabriel's "That'll Do", written and composed by Randy Newman, was nominated for Best Original Song at the 71st Academy Awards.

Soundtrack
The musical score for Babe: Pig in the City was composed by Nigel Westlake, who previously wrote the music for Babe. A soundtrack album was released on 24 November 1998 by Geffen Records featuring Westlake's score, music inspired to the movie...as well as sound clips taken from film. The soundtrack also includes source music such as "Chattanooga Choo Choo" by Glenn Miller and "That's Amore" by Dean Martin. Additional tracks include the Academy Award-nominated theme song "That'll Do" and a song sung by Elizabeth Daily, the voice of Babe.

Home media
The film was released on VHS, DVD (in both widescreen and pan and scan formats), and laserdisc on 4 May 1999. On 22 May 2001, the film was released on DVD as a 2-pack with the original Babe. On September 23, 2003, it was re-released on DVD as part of "The Complete Adventure Two-Movie Pig Pack" in its separate widescreen and pan and scan formats. On November 12, 2004, it was re-released onto DVD as part of a Family Double Feature, which includes Babe with the widescreen and the pan and scan versions of the film. On May 7, 2013, it was released on Blu-ray for the 15th Anniversary Edition of the film's release and re-released on Blu-ray by Fabulous Films Limited in UK on June 17, 2017.

Video game
In 2006, a universally-panned video game based on the film  was released on PlayStation 2.

References

External links

 
 
 
 
 Babe: Pig in the City at Ozmovies

1998 films
1990s fantasy comedy-drama films
1998 fantasy films
American children's comedy films
American children's drama films
American children's fantasy films
American comedy-drama films
American fantasy comedy-drama films
American sequel films
Australian children's fantasy films
Australian fantasy comedy-drama films
Australian sequel films
Films scored by Nigel Westlake
Films about animals
Films about apes
Films about ducks
Films about pigs
Films directed by George Miller
Films produced by George Miller
Films produced by Bill Miller
Films produced by Doug Mitchell
Films set in hotels
Films shot in Sydney
Kennedy Miller Mitchell films
Universal Pictures films
Films with screenplays by George Miller
1998 comedy films
1998 drama films
1990s English-language films
1990s American films